Alfred Price may refer to:

Alfred Price (engineer) (1838–1907), New Zealand manufacturing engineer
Alfred Price (cricketer) (1862–1942), English cricketer
Alfred Price (author) (died 2017), author on aviation and related topics